John Hollywood (23 May 1926 – 16 July 1952) was a New Zealand cricketer. He played seven first-class matches for Auckland between 1947 and 1950. He went to the University of Sydney to study veterinary medicine, but died there in July 1952 during his third year. His death was recorded as suicide.

See also
 List of Auckland representative cricketers

References

External links
 

1926 births
1952 suicides
New Zealand cricketers
Auckland cricketers
Cricketers from Auckland
Suicides in New South Wales